Leonor Cecotto (died 8 May 1982, Asunción, Paraguay) was a 20th-century Latin American painter and engraver. Born in Argentina, she resided in Paraguay for the majority of her life, eventually becoming a prominent artist in the latter country. She was known for both her paintings and her xylographs.

Biography 
Cecotto was born in Ciudad de Formosa, Argentina, in 1918, 1920 or 1922. 
Her parents were Vicente González Leiva (Spanish) and Catalina Cecotto (Argentinian). Her father was a piano tuner, and she initially studied piano, and taught piano to earn money.
From a young age, Leonor Cecotto resided in Paraguay.

Cecotto was largely self-educated, in part because her father forbade her to attend El Ateneo Paraguayo (the Paraguayan Athenaeum). She was taught drawing and painting privately at home, by a French artist, Francis Eugene Charles. 
In the 1950s she approached João Rossi, a Brazilian professor at a YMCA-hosted arts workshop. Rossi—known as a driving force for a "modernization" of the contemporary Paraguayan plastic arts—introduced Cecotto to professional art. 
Cecotto was also influenced by Livio Abramo, a Brazilian-born engraver who also resided in Paraguay and taught woodcut courses.

As a result of her contributions, Cecotto is considered part of the Grupo Arte Nuevo, a school of influential 20th-century Paraguayan artists.
Ceocotto was a founder of the Center de Artistas Plasticos del Paraguay, and taught drawing and painting at the Female Institute of Integrated Culture in Asuncion. 
Her students included Bernardo Krasniansky.

She died in Asuncion in 1982.

Reception 
In Paraguay, Cecotto earned several awards, most notably the First Prize for Painting in the Second Salon d'Automne and the first prize in an engraving contest organized by the Centro Cultural Paraguayo Americano in 1966.

In his 1984 book Una interpretación de las artes visuales en el Paraguay, Paraguayan art critic (and future Paraguayan minister of culture) Ticio Escobar noted of the artist; 

Cecotto's work can be found in the Metropolitan Museum of Art, the National Library of France, the Art Museum of the Americas, in the collection of the University of Sydney, the Centro de Artes Visuales de Asunción, and in private collections.

Exhibitions

Notes

References 

1920 births
1982 deaths
20th-century Argentine women artists
20th-century Argentine artists
20th-century Paraguayan artists
Paraguayan artists
Paraguayan women artists
Argentine emigrants to Paraguay